For the European Commission project, see Destination Earth (European Union)

Destination Earth is a 1956 promotional cartoon created by John Sutherland and funded by the American Petroleum Institute. The short explains the fundamentals of the petroleum industry and how petroleum products enrich everyday life in the United States of America, as well as the benefits of a free market economy.

Synopsis
Destination Earth begins on the planet Mars, where the emperor Ogg (reminiscent of Stalin) is addressing an arena of his subjects. During the speech, Ogg dictates his audience's reactions, through a remote-controlled teleprompt. He then welcomes a bumbling subordinate Martian, Captain Cosmic, onto the stage to share his discoveries from a mission to Earth.

In a flashback scene, Cosmic exalts Ogg's ingenious discoveries, such as Ogg-Energy (a Martian powered treadmill). However, Ogg's method of powering his royal limousine with Ogg-Stick dynamite proves faulty; thus, he orders Captain Cosmic into space to find out other planets' energy sources. The Martian sets off and lands in the United States. He ventures into a nearby city and becomes awestruck when he sees average citizens with "powerful and reliable automobiles" that make their daily lives easier. The Martian then enters a library and researches the "secrets" of the remarkable power source. The Martian triumphantly returns to Mars with stolen library books on the oil industry. After reading from them, the population of Mars deserts Ogg and sets up their own oil companies. The short ends with the slogan "destination unlimited" written across the screen.

References

External links
 
Destination Earth at the TCM Movie Database
 

1956 animated films
1956 films
1950s science fiction films
1950s animated short films
Films about extraterrestrial life
Mars in film
Films directed by Carl Urbano
1950s English-language films